This is a list of artists selected for the New Museum Triennial exhibitions of contemporary art, at the New Museum in New York City, USA.

2009
The first New Museum Triennial "The Generational Triennial: Younger than Jesus" curated by Massimiliano Gioni was on view from April 8 until July 12, 2009.

2012
The second New Museum Triennial "The Ungovernables" curated by Eungie Joo and Ryan Inouye was on view from February 15 until April 22, 2012.

2015
The third New Museum Triennial "Surround Audience" curated by Lauren Cornell and Ryan Trecartin was on view from February 25 until May 24, 2015.

2018
The fourth New Museum Triennial "Songs for Sabotage" curated by Gary Carrion-Murayari and Alex Gartenfeld was on view from February 13, 2018 until May 27, 2018.

2021
The fifth New Museum Triennial "Soft Water Hard Stone" curated by Margot Norton and Jamillah James will be on view from 28 October, 2021 until January 23, 2022.

References

External links

Visual arts awards